Talkin' Blues is a live album by Bob Marley & The Wailers, released in 1991. It contains live studio recordings from 1973 and 1975 intercut with interview segments of Bob Marley. The majority of tracks are taken from the recordings Bob Marley & The Wailers did on 31 October 1973, at The Record Plant in Sausalito, California, for San Francisco radio station KSAN. They include "You Can't Blame the Youth", sung by Peter Tosh, and "Get Up, Stand Up" with Bob Marley and Peter Tosh alternatingly taking lead vocals. The remaining tracks are taken from recordings made before the release of 1974's Natty Dread album, a performance at The Lyceum Theatre in London and interview segments from Jamaican radio in 1975.

Track listing

Original album (1991)

The Definitive Remasters edition (2002)

Personnel

1973 recordings
 Bob Marley - vocals, guitar
 Peter Tosh - vocals, guitar
 Aston "Familyman" Barrett - bass
 Carlton "Carly" Barrett - drums, percussion
 Earl "Wire" Lindo - keyboards
 Joe Higgs - vocals, percussion

1974 recordings
 Bob Marley - vocals, guitar
 Aston "Familyman" Barrett - bass
 Carlton "Carly" Barrett - drums, percussion
 Bernard "Touter" Harvey - piano, organ
 Al Anderson - lead guitar
 The I-Threes: Rita Marley, Marcia Griffiths, Judy Mowatt - background vocals

1975 recording
personnel as 1974 except Carlton Barrett on drums only, without Harvey, and with the addition of
 Tyrone Downie - keyboards
 Alvin "Seeco" Patterson - percussion

Additional personnel
Dermot Hussey - interviewer

Web sources

Bob Marley and the Wailers live albums
1991 live albums
Tuff Gong albums